Claudio Panatta and Tomáš Šmíd were the defending champions, but did not participate this year.

Sergio Casal and Javier Sánchez won in the final 6–4, 6–3, against Tom Kempers and Richard Krajicek.

Seeds

  Sergio Casal /  Javier Sánchez (champions)
  Mark Koevermans /  Diego Pérez (semifinals)
  Tomás Carbonell /  Guillermo Pérez Roldán (quarterfinals)
  Ronnie Båthman /  Rikard Bergh (semifinals)

Draw

Draw

References
Draw

ATP Athens Open
Athens Open